Michel Chapuis (born 18 June 1941) is a French sprint canoer who competed in the early 1960s. He won the silver medal in the C-2 1000 m event at the 1964 Summer Olympics in Tokyo.

References
Sports-reference.com profile

1941 births
Canoeists at the 1964 Summer Olympics
French male canoeists
Living people
Olympic canoeists of France
Olympic silver medalists for France
Olympic medalists in canoeing
Medalists at the 1964 Summer Olympics